Bruce Kelly (June 11, 1956 - April 30, 2017) was an American radio / TV personality. According to Alexander Zaitchik at Salon.com,  "Kelly was a flamboyant master of publicity stunts as well as a top-rated morning jock".

Career
He was the original program director, format creator and morning personality on The 80s on 8 from XM Satellite Radio in Washington, D.C. from October 2000 to November 2005.  Kelly was also the first "live" human voice heard on XM or Sirius Satellite Radio during XM studio's beta test launch in May 2001.
 
In November 2005, he resigned to care for his ailing seventy-nine year old Father, Thomas W. Grimes, who suffered a series of strokes. Thomas died from kidney cancer February, 2017. 

On April 30, 2007, Lincoln Financial Media announced Kelly as the replacement in morning drive on WMXJ for South Florida media icon Rick Shaw, retiring after 50+ years on air in the market. His stint at the station lasted only for his initial one-year contract amid decidedly mixed audience reviews. Friday, April 25, 2008, was his last Majic show.

Station management blamed "flat" ratings, however an ironic twist surfaced with the next ratings book in May showing prior to Kelly's dismissal, the show had improved from 10th to 5th place in the prior quarter in the key demographic of listeners aged 35 to 64.

In October 2008, Kelly announced his next position as Co-Manager of Bob Marley's The Original Wailers, the backup-musicians for the reggae legend's career from 1973 until his death in May 1981.  Kelly conducted the last media interview with Marley only months before his death.

In September 2009, Kelly was an integral part of a three-page feature on Salon.com about the career of talk radio star Glenn Beck.
The expose became an internet blog sensation because of the re-telling of a 1988 on-air incident between Beck and Kelly's then wife.  The articles became the foundation of a new book Common Nonsense: Glenn Beck and the Triumph of Ignorance by author Alexander Zaitchik –  released in the early summer of 2010.

September, 2010, Kelly accepted a new position as morning host of WZFG, a talk radio station in Fargo/Moorhead and program director of sister station KEGK, both owned by Great Plains Integrated Marketing.

In late December 2010, Great Plains Integrated Marketing's Board of Directors appointed Kelly – Vice President Of Programming for the four station group.

Kelly is featured in an independently produced documentary "Airplay: The Rise And Fall Of Rock Radio", shown on PBS stations nationwide since 2009.

Kelly returned to Arizona in October 2011 as the new Operations Manager of 90.7 KVIT "The Goldmine", a non-commercial radio station owned by the East Valley Institute of Technology in Mesa.

On May 1, 2012, KVIT added a second signal at 92.7, simulcasting their original East Valley signal 90.7 and providing coverage over the entire Phoenix Metro area. In addition, the return of Bruce Kelly and Company morning radio show returned to Valley airwaves after a twelve-year absence.

On January 5, 2013, Kelly also joined CBS Radio's Phoenix Classic Hits KOOL-FM, for a once a week special "The KOOL Saturday Night Special with Bruce Kelly".

Kelly left KOOL-FM in February 2014 to join the newly formed "The National Marijuana News" as lead anchor / interviewer. The show, a hybrid TV / Radio product, will soft launch on streaming Live365,  YouTube, Vimeo in June 2014. Terrestrial and satellite radio will follow, as well as cable TV. ""

Show producers describe the show as "first legitimate news source covering medical and recreational marijuana ... including new laws and advocacy movements across the country.

On April 30 2017, Kelly was found unresponsive at his Arizona home. Kelly had been a long time sufferer of Erectile Dysfunction and had finally succumbed to the disorder.

Media coverage
Throughout his career, Kelly has frequently been the subject of national headlines, including the following:
the 1987 removal of Evan Mecham as governor of Arizona
Founder and host of 1989's "Radio Relief", in which all Phoenix 24 radio and TV stations participated in a fund raiser to benefit victims of the 1989 Loma Prieta earthquake
a 1991 April Fools' Day hoax involving the "accidental death" of cartoon character Bart Simpson
In 2000 as the Washington Redskins on-field/booth announcer, he became the only NFL announcer in history to be fined ($60,000) for interrupting play during a home regular season game against the Tampa Bay Buccaneers. In 2012, the NFL adopted a new rule that used the very 3rd down P.A. tactics that Kelly used.

Kelly has also been featured in The Washington Post, USA Today, The Arizona Republic, The Boston Globe, and Nightline, in addition to dozens of local TV, magazine and newspaper features.

Publicity stunts
Starting in the mid-1970s, Kelly continued a long-held radio tradition of over-the-top publicity stunts for the benefit of local charities. Some of the many stunts that attracted national media coverage include:

1976 — In front of a crowd of 10,000 
and dressed in a white tuxedo, jumped into a vat containing 20,000 US gallons (80 m³) of orange flavored Jello at Kings Dominion

• 1979- Crawled through a 2 mile spanking line at Baltimore harbor
1983 — Over the course of three days, sat in every seat (59,000) of Pittsburgh's Three Rivers Stadium
1984 — In less than 72 hours, completed the entire Boston Marathon, on a custom-made pogo stick
1990 — Demolished over 3000 Milli Vanilli LPs and CDs with a steamroller in protest over the duo's Grammy award being revoked due to controversy surrounding their lack of actual singing on the recordings
1997 — Became the first heterosexual to be Grand Marshal of a nationally recognized gay pride parade, after numerous gay public figures declined, most notably Arizona Congressman Jim Kolbe

Other career highlights
In 1976, after college, Kelly worked in Charlottesville, Virginia at then WELK-AM (1400) as Program director and afternoon-drive then moved on to Richmond's WLEE-AM, one of the last few AM Top 40 stations left in America. He quickly crossed the street to the giant, 200,000 watt market leader, WRVQ – FM, known as Q – 94.

Kelly was #1 rated in WRVQ Richmond, 96-X and Y-100 (WHYI) Miami, WPGC-FM Washington, D.C., WBZZ Pittsburgh, WHTT-FM Hot Hits Boston, and most notably, fifteen consecutive years as the dominant morning radio personality in Phoenix, from 1985 through 1999, on KZZP, Y-95, and KKFR.

In 1990 he was honored by Billboard magazine as the CHR personality of the year.

Kelly is an alumnus of Virginia Polytechnic Institute and State University and the student radio station, WUVT-FM. He is also a graduate of T.C. Williams High School.

References 

American radio personalities
Living people
1956 births